EducationUSA is a U.S. Department of State network of international student advising centers in more than 170 countries. EducationUSA is officially a branch in the Office of Global Educational Programs in the Bureau of Educational and Cultural Affairs (ECA). ECA fosters mutual understanding between the United States and other countries by promoting personal, professional, and institutional ties between private citizens and organizations in the United States and abroad, as well as by presenting U.S. history, society, art and culture to overseas audiences.

Services

Advisers offer a wide range of in-person and virtual services to students and their families based on Your 5 Steps to U.S. Study, a guide to navigating the U.S. higher education application process. Advisers provide information on a host of topics, including:

 The admissions process and standardized testing requirements
 How to finance a U.S. education
 The student visa process 
 Preparing for departure to the United States

Programs
Opportunity Funds Program
The EducationUSA Opportunity Funds program assists highly qualified students who are likely to be awarded full financial aid from U.S. colleges and universities, but lack the financial resources to cover the up-front costs to apply, such as testing, application fees, or airfare.

Each Opportunity Funds student undergoes a selective process of evaluation by an EducationUSA adviser, Regional Educational Advising Coordinator (REAC), and the Public Affairs Section of a U.S. Embassy/Consulate. More than 100 colleges and universities have enrolled Opportunity Funds students since 2006.

References

https://www.iie.org/en/Scholars-Faculty-and-Administrators/Education-USA.aspx, retrieved 7 June 2011

See also

 Study abroad
 AFS Intercultural Programs
 Student exchange program
 International students
 ERASMUS programme (European Union)
 Belgian American Educational Foundation (BAEF)
 Fulbright Austria
 Fulbright Iceland
 Fulbright Fellowship
 Harkness Fellowship
 ITT International Fellowship Program
 Monbukagakusho Scholarship
 Goodwill Scholarships

Education in the United States
Bureau of Educational and Cultural Affairs